The Sicilian Open was a European Tour men's professional golf tournament. It was played for the first time in 2011.  The event was held in Sicily at the Donnafugata Golf Resort & Spa. In 2012 the event was held at Verdura Golf & Spa Resort on a links-style course running up to the coastline. After a four-year hiatus, the tournament returned to the European Tour schedule in 2017 and 2018 at Verdura, with Rocco Forte Hotels the title sponsor. As of 2019, the event is no longer held.

Winners

External links
Coverage on European Tour's official site
Coverage of 2011 and 2012 events on European Tour's official site
2017 Rocco Forte Open on Verdura Resort site

Former European Tour events
Golf tournaments in Italy
Sport in Sicily